Pinghai Ancient City is a historic town in southern Renping Peninsula, Huidong County, Huizhou, Guangdong, China. It was established in year 1385. Currently, much of its defense walls and houses along with four of its gatehouses, still remain intact. A number of forts were constructed around the town.

References

Huizhou